Anatoly Zaytsev (born 9 January 1947) is a Soviet skier. He competed in the Nordic combined event at the 1972 Winter Olympics.

References

External links
 

1947 births
Living people
Soviet male Nordic combined skiers
Olympic Nordic combined skiers of the Soviet Union
Nordic combined skiers at the 1972 Winter Olympics
Sportspeople from Tomsk